Cameron Mitchell Restaurants is a restaurant group headquartered in Columbus, Ohio. It owns restaurants under various names, many of which are located in Central Ohio.

The group's Ocean Prime concept opened in Troy, Michigan in June 2008 and has locations in Columbus, (under the name Mitchell's Ocean Club), and in thirteen other cities across the United States. The company also manages and co-owns a sister company, Rusty Bucket Restaurant & Tavern.

The group formerly owned the Mitchell's Steakhouse and Mitchell's Fish Market brands, but sold both of these concepts along with one Cameron's Steakhouse location to Ruth's Chris in February 2008.

Cameron Mitchell Restaurants 
The Avenue Steak Tavern
Dublin, Ohio
Grandview Heights, Ohio
The Barn at Rocky Fork Creek
Gahanna, Ohio
Budd Dairy Food Hall
Italian Village, Columbus, Ohio
Cameron's American Bistro
Worthington, Ohio
 Cameron Mitchell Premier Events
 Columbus, Ohio
 Cap City Fine Diner & Bar
 Gahanna, Ohio
 Grandview Heights, Ohio
 Dublin, Ohio
Del Mar SoCal Kitchen
Short North, Columbus, Ohio
Naples, Florida (opening Fall 2020)
 Harvey and Ed's Delicatessen
Short North, Columbus, Ohio
Hudson 29
New Albany, Ohio
Upper Arlington, Ohio
Lincoln Social Rooftop
Short North, Columbus, Ohio
The Guild House
Columbus, Ohio
Marcella's
Polaris Fashion Place, Columbus, Ohio
Short North, Columbus, Ohio
 Martini Modern Italian
 Arena District, Columbus, Ohio
 Mitchell's Ocean Club
 Easton Town Center, Columbus, Ohio
 Molly Woo's Asian Bistro
 Polaris Fashion Place, Columbus, Ohio
 Ocean Prime
Beverly Hills, California
Boston
Chicago
Dallas
Denver - Larimer Square
Denver - Tech Center
Detroit
Indianapolis
Naples, Florida
New York City
Orlando, Florida
Philadelphia
Phoenix, Arizona
Tampa, Florida
The Pearl | Restaurant, Tavern & Oyster room
Short North, Columbus, Ohio
Bridge Park, Dublin, Ohio

Cameron Mitchell 
Cameron Mitchell is president and founder of Cameron Mitchell Restaurants. He gained notoriety in the restaurant industry in 2008, when two of the company's concepts: Mitchell's/Columbus Fish Market and Mitchell's/Cameron's Steakhouse—a total of 22 units—sold to Ruth's Hospitality Group for $92 million.

Mitchell is a 1986 graduate of the Culinary Institute of America, where he was the first alumnus to hold the position of Chairman Emeritus of the Board of Trustees. He is also the school's largest alumni donor.

In 1993, Mitchell began Cameron Mitchell Restaurants by opening its first concept, Cameron's American Bistro. As a result of the development of several new concepts and expansion of its more popular concepts, Cameron Mitchell Restaurants became a 33-unit, multi-concept operation with locations in nine states. Before the sale of its two biggest concepts in 2008, the company's annual sales surpassed $120 million.

Nine Cameron Mitchell Restaurants remain independent and privately held, with nine concepts and 19 units, including the steakhouse and seafood restaurant, Ocean Prime, as well as a separate catering company and sister company, The Rusty Bucket Restaurant & Tavern.

References

External links
 Cameron Mitchell Restaurants

Companies based in the Columbus, Ohio metropolitan area
Regional restaurant chains in the United States
Restaurants in Ohio